Murchison is a town in Mopani District Municipality in the Limpopo province of South Africa.

Mining village 20 km north-east of Leydsdorp and 44 km west of Phalaborwa. Named after Sir Roderick Murchison, a geologist and former President of the Royal Geographical Society (RGS), who prospected in the area.

References

Populated places in the Ba-Phalaborwa Local Municipality
Mining communities in South Africa